Chinthavishtayaya Shyamala  (English: Shyamala lost in thought) is a 1998 Malayalam black comedy film written and directed by Sreenivasan, starring Sangita, Sreenivasan, Thilakan, Innocent, Nedumudi Venu, Sudheesh, and Siddique.The film is about an irresponsible husband and his neglected family. It won the National Film Award for Best Film on Other Social Issues. The film is one of the classic family dramas in Malayalam. The film was remade in Tamil as Chidambarathil Oru Appasamy and in Telugu as Aavide Shyamala.

Sangita won the Kerala State Film Award for Best Actress for her role Shyamala. It was Mohanlal who suggested Sangita for Shyamala. The character still remains one of the best female characters in Malayalam cinema. The film won two Filmfare Awards South.

Plot
Vijayan, the village school teacher, believes that his degree in economics will make him succeed in the business ventures he undertakes. Taking long leaves of absence from work, he goes around with his schemes, all of which turn out to be downright failures.

The movie opens with a light portrayal of the misery of his benevolent wife Shyamala and their two daughters, with Vijayan away on his latest venture — an attempt to shoot a short ad film under influence of his friend. It ends, predictably, with Vijayan taking to his heels when it is apparent that he has never seen a film being shot in his life before and thought he could just wing it without experience. Karunan "Mash", Vijayan's father, is worried for his son and daughter-in-law and their children by seeing Vijayan not taking seriously his regular job in hand and going after dreams beyond his capability. His wife is under-educated and believes what her husband is doing is right for their family and what they face is a momentary crisis. He knows this and misuses this for slacking off on his responsibilities. As a last resort to reform his son Karunan and father-in-law Achuthan Nair suggests that Vijayan undertake the annual pilgrimage to the Hindu hilltop temple Sabarimala and reorder life with responsibility. Despite his initial protests, Vijayan undertakes his pilgrimage because he starts to lose ground for his acts, by observing the customary 41-day fasting and abstinence.

Sabarimala changes him. On his return from his pilgrimage, his family discovers to their dismay that matters have swung to the other extreme. Vijayan takes faith to his heart, embraces vegetarianism and adopts a life of prayer, frugality and abstinence, eventually forsaking his debt-ridden family for a life at an ashram. His version of ashram life is one of round-the-clock prayer and an escape from daily responsibilities and work — which doesn't go well with the other residents. Soon the residents find out Vijayan has a family and abandon them thinking they would be taken care of by God since they are innocent and his primary aim for becoming a Sanyasi is to craft gold and money from the ether as some fake Sanyasi's do rather than service. The head of the ashram guides him to lose his inferiority complexes and betray himself because knowing oneself and taking up responsibilities is the foundation of true wisdom and freedom. He soon finds himself unwelcome there and returns to his home, to discover his family have moved on without him and sustains without hunger or by borrowing money as they did in the past from a tailoring business contract his wife took after he left. During her sister's marriage day she guides her sister to complete her studies and should take up a job that could make her role in their family as an equally responsible person. Vijayan tries to get back into his family which he abandoned. He tries to win his family's heart through acts and mediation's, his wife censures him for his new low. He continues with his acts to convince his wife but she finally says she sees through all these and to leave them alone. Vijayan finally breakdown but his wife rejects it which makes him declare that he is leaving them for sure if it is what they need. His wife asks him why was the emotional whimpering a moment ago and did he even think how they felt for months when Vijayan rejected and left them alone. She says there were many who suggested she remarry but she lived through each night with the hope that Vijayan would return and if this is the resolution he has come up with finally, he should go wherever he wishes. The next day with a true change of heart he returns to his teaching and the film ends with Vijayan returning to his home with his wife and children through a road where Communist leaders and Sabarimala pilgrims are marching in opposite directions.

Cast

 Sangita as Shyamala
 Sreenivasan as Vijayan
 Thilakan as Karunan
 Innocent as Achuthan Nair
 Kamala Devi as Innocent's Wife
 Sudheesh as Suku
 Nedumudi Venu as The Headmaster
 Mamukkoya as Usman
 Siddique as Johnnykutty
 Unni Mannanur as Swamiji
 Kripa as Divya
 Shafna as Kavya
 Augustine as Barbar Chandhran

 R Parthiban

Title
The title and plot of the film are inspired by Chinthavishtayaaya Sita, a celebrated work by Malayalam poet and social reformer Kumaran Asan. The poem describes the philosophic musings of Sita and her confrontation with her husband Rama, towards the end of the Ramayana epic. As in the poem, the film portrays the silent struggle, sacrifice, and finally the emancipation of the character Shyamala.

Remakes
It was remade in Telugu as Avide Shyamala by Kodi Ramakrishna. This film was later remade into Tamil as Chidambarathil Oru Appasamy in 2005 directed by Thangar Bachan who also starred in lead role. It was also remade in Hindi as SRK with Vinay Pathak but it remains unreleased.

Reception
This was Sreenivasan's second directorial effort and won critical and commercial success and further established his position in Malayalam cinema as a gifted comedian and screenwriter. The film won the National Film Award for Best Film on Other Social Issues in 1999. It won the Kerala State Film Award for Best Popular Film in 1998.

Box office
The film became commercial success. It ran more than 150 days in theatres.

Awards and honours

Soundtrack 
The film's soundtrack contains 2 songs, all composed by Johnson and Lyrics by Gireesh Puthenchery and Yusafali kecheri.

References

External links
 

1998 films
1990s Malayalam-language films
Films with screenplays by Sreenivasan
Indian black comedy films
Films scored by Johnson
1990s black comedy films
Malayalam films remade in other languages
Best Film on Other Social Issues National Film Award winners
Films shot in Thrissur